Tolstoy-Yurt (Devkar-Evla) is a rural locality (a selo) and the administrative center of Groznensky District, the Chechen Republic, Russia. Population: 

The town is named after the Russian author Leo Tolstoy.

In 2005 Aslan Maskhadov, the third president of the self-proclaimed Chechen Republic of Ichkeria, was reportedly killed in fighting in the locality of Tolstoy-Yurt. Maskhadov was reportedly killed when a Russian special forces soldier threw a grenade into his bunker.

References

Notes

Sources

Rural localities in Groznensky District